Rachida Ouerdane (born 2 May 1979) is an Algerian judoka, who competed in the middleweight category. She is a three-time champion at the African Judo Championships, and a two-time medalist at the Mediterranean Games. She also won a gold medal in the same division at the 2007 All-Africa Games in Algiers.

Ouerdane made her official debut for the 2004 Summer Olympics in Athens, where she lost the first preliminary match of women's middleweight class (70 kg), with a waza-ari (half-point) and a kosoto gake (small outer hook), to China's Qin Dongya.

At the 2008 Summer Olympics in Beijing, Ouerdane competed for the second time in the women's 70 kg class. She received a bye for the second preliminary round, before losing out by a waza-ari to Netherlands' Edith Bosch. Because her opponent advanced further into the semi-finals, Ouerdane offered another shot for the bronze medal by defeating Fiji's Sisilia Nasiga, with an ippon and a sankaku gatame (arm crush triangular arm lock), in the first repechage bout. Unfortunately, she finished only in ninth place, after losing out the second repechage bout to United States' Ronda Rousey, who successfully scored an ippon and a kuzure-kesa-gatame (broken scarf mat hold), in two minutes.

References

External links

NBC Olympics Profile

1979 births
Algerian female judoka
Olympic judoka of Algeria
Judoka at the 2004 Summer Olympics
Judoka at the 2008 Summer Olympics
Mediterranean Games silver medalists for Algeria
Mediterranean Games bronze medalists for Algeria
Competitors at the 2001 Mediterranean Games
Competitors at the 2009 Mediterranean Games
Living people
African Games gold medalists for Algeria
African Games medalists in judo
Mediterranean Games medalists in judo
Competitors at the 2007 All-Africa Games
21st-century Algerian people